Cafe Hostess is a 1940 American crime film directed by Sidney Salkow and starring Preston Foster and Ann Dvorak. The screenplay was written by Harold Shumate, based on a story by Tay Garnett and Howard Higgin. Prior to filming the studio had been warned by the MPAA that the film did not comply with its code, but it is unclear whether changes were made to the script.

Plot
Jo is a hostess, also known as a "B" girl (a euphemism for a prostitute), in a clip joint, a seedy waterfront nightclub where the patrons are set up for a pickpocket operation. The club is owned by Eddie Morgan, who keeps an eye on things by posing as the piano player. A former hostess, Annie, returns to the club in order to tell Morgan off and let him know that he ruined her life. Not getting satisfaction, she attempts to get Jo to turn witness against Morgan in order to get him arrested, but Jo is too afraid. While there, Annie witnesses Jo being treated roughly by a local hood, Red Connolly (William Pawley), who she accosts, which turns into a brawl.

Dan Walters, a sailor, and two friends show up at the club, and Jo begins to flirt with him. Finding that she likes him, she does not want to follow her usual routine of getting him drunk and taking his wallet, but Morgan insists. However, she is clumsy in her attempt, and is thwarted by Walters, who leaves, disillusioned with Jo, who he was beginning to like. Jo realizes that she would like to get out of her occupation, but Annie's failure to start a new life after leaving makes her unsure. Morgan is furious that she failed to lift the wallet, and slaps her around, leaving her bruised. When Walters returns to the club later, he notices the bruises and in an effort to get Jo out of the situation, offers to marry her and move away with her.

To assist in his plan to rescue Jo, Walters begins to snoop around in order to get dirt on Morgan. He uncovers quite a bit of illegal activity, and approaches Steve Mason, an undercover detective, with the information. Morgan learns from Nellie, the owner of another local establishment, of Walters' plan to take Jo away, and also discovers that Walters has spoken to Mason. He attempts to do away with Walters; the result is an all-out brawl, during which Morgan himself is knifed to death. Annie confesses to stabbing Morgan and gives herself up to Mason, who takes her away.

Cast
 Preston Foster as Dan Walters
 Ann Dvorak as Jo
 Douglas Fowley as Eddie Morgan
 Wynne Gibson as Annie
 Arthur Loft as Steve Mason
 Bruce Bennett as Budge
 Eddie Acuff as Scotty
 Bradley Page as Al
 Linda Winters as Tricks
 Beatrice Blinn as Daisy
 Dick Wessel as Willie
 Peggy Shannon as Nellie

Production
Before filming began, the Production Code Administration (PCA) of the MPAA issued a complaint to Columbia that the script was in violation of three of the production code tenets. They were its "general sordid, low-toned background and flavor"; the fact that the film's hero is a thief who does not face punishment; and that Annie, a confessed murderess, is also allowed to escape without punishment. The PCA made several suggestions to the head of Columbia, Harry Cohn, on changes that should be made, although it is unclear whether Cohn had any changes made to the script. The film was originally titled Street of Missing Women. It began production in the last week of September 1939. Members of the cast announced at that time included Ann Dvorak, Preston Foster, Arthur Loft, Wynne Gibson, Betty Compson, and Peggy Shannon. Compson, Gibson and Shannon had been stars during the silent era, and were now cast as "B" girls in the film. Still under the title Street of Missing Women, the film's shooting wrapped the week of October 24. On October 25, Variety released the names of several additional cast members: Bruce Bennett, Don Beddoe, Douglas Fowley, Lorna Gray, Linda Winters, and Beatrice Blinn. This was Bennett's first film under this stage name; prior to this he had been billed as Herman Brix.

On October 31 Columbia announced that they were retitling the film to Cafe Hostess. By November 11, it was announced that the film would be released on November 30. The Legion of Decency gave the film an "A-2" classification, meaning it was only suitable for adult audiences. One of the title cards at the beginning of the movie read: "B-Girls...Bar Girls...Cafe Hostesses...Products of a man-made system, these girls whose stock in a trade is a tireless smile, a sympathetic ear and a shoddy evening gown, they prey on the very men who made them what they are. The Cafe Hostess knows only one law...A lady must live!" At least two local censorship boards, in Alberta and Pennsylvania, required the removal of that title card.

Reception
Motion Picture Daily gave the film a lukewarm review, calling it a "routine melodrama", although the reviewer did praise the efforts of the cast. The Motion Picture Herald gave the film a more positive review, although the reviewer felt the story was "unexciting". He noted "occasional outstanding melodramatic moments" and complimented the acting of the entire cast and especially Salkow's direction, stating that his deft pacing sustained the film despite the flawed story.

References

External links
 
 
 

Films directed by Sidney Salkow
Columbia Pictures films
American black-and-white films
American crime drama films
1940 crime drama films
1940 films
1940s English-language films
1940s American films